The Nardoo Hills Reserves (including the Judith Eardley Reserve) comprise two adjoining parcels of land, with a combined area of 5.9 km2, as a nature reserve in north-central Victoria, Australia.  They are located 12 km north of Wedderburn, 100 km north-west of Bendigo and 240 km north-west of Melbourne.  They are owned and managed by Bush Heritage Australia (BHA), by which they were purchased in 2005 and 2006.  With the nearby Wychitella Nature Conservation Reserve, they protect remnant grassy woodlands, a habitat much cleared in the past.  A threatened bird species found on the reserves is the Hooded Robin  In 2007 an endangered plant, the Northern Golden Moth Orchid was found on the reserve. In 2009 a species of orchid thought to be extinct, the Robust Greenhood, was rediscovered there.

References

External links
 Bush Heritage Australia

Bush Heritage Australia reserves
Nature reserves in Victoria (Australia)
2005 establishments in Australia